Hur Suk-ho (born 20 August 1973), who is usually known as SK Ho in English, is a South Korean professional golfer who plays mainly on the Japan Golf Tour.

Career
Hur was born in Seoul. He attended Chae Yoog University and turned pro in 1995. He joined the Japanese Tour in 2001 and has won eight tournaments on it. He has made several appearances in major championships and World Golf Championships events.

Professional wins (12)

Japan Golf Tour wins (8)

*Note: The 2004 Japan PGA Championship was shortened to 54 holes due to weather.

Japan Golf Tour playoff record (1–2)

Asian Tour wins (1)

1Co-sanctioned by the Korean Tour

Asian Tour playoff record (1–0)

Japan Challenge Tour wins (3)

Results in major championships

CUT = missed the half-way cut
"T" = tied
Note: Hur never played in the Masters Tournament or the U.S. Open.

Results in World Golf Championships

"T" = Tied

Team appearances
World Cup (representing South Korea): 2002, 2003, 2006
Royal Trophy (representing Asia): 2006, 2007, 2009 (winners)

References

External links

South Korean male golfers
Japan Golf Tour golfers
1973 births
Living people